Kivu Province was a province in the Belgian Congo, originally called Costermansville Province, that was formed in 1933 from part of the old Orientale Province.
The Republic of the Congo (Léopoldville) became independent in 1960, and between 1962 and 1966 the province was temporarily broken into the provinces of Maniema, North Kivu and South Kivu. In 1988 it was again broken into these provinces.

Location

Kivu is the name of the entire region surrounding Lake Kivu, including the portions in Rwanda which contain the vast majority of the lake area's population

History

In 1933 the provinces of the Belgian Congo were reorganized, and the amount of autonomy of the former provinces was reduced.
The new provinces took the name of their capital, with the Orientale Province being split into Stanleyville Province and Costermansville Province.
Costermansville Province was renamed Kivu Province in 1947.
It was broken into the provinces of Maniema, North Kivu and South Kivu from 10 May 1962 to 28 December 1966, then reunited.
In 1988 it was again broken up into the provinces of Maniema, North Kivu and South Kivu.

See also

 List of governors of Kivu

References

Sources

Provinces of the Belgian Congo
Former provinces of the Democratic Republic of the Congo (pre-1966)
Former provinces of the Democratic Republic of the Congo (1966–2015)